This list provides names given in history and traditions for people who appear to be unnamed in the Bible.

Hebrew Bible

Serpent of Genesis
Revelation 12 identifies the serpent with Satan, unlike the pseudepigraphical-apocryphal Apocalypse of Moses (Vita Adae et Evae) where the Devil works with the serpent.

Wives of the antediluvian patriarchs
The pseudepigraphical Book of Jubilees provides names for a host of otherwise unnamed biblical characters, including wives for most of the antediluvian patriarchs. The last of these is Noah's wife, to whom it gives the name of Emzara. Other Jewish traditional sources contain many different names for Noah's wife.

The Book of Jubilees says that Awan was Adam and Eve's first daughter. Their second daughter Azura married Seth. For many of the early wives in the series, Jubilees notes that the patriarchs married their sisters.

The Cave of Treasures and the earlier Kitab al-Magall (part of Clementine literature) name entirely different women as the wives of the patriarchs, with considerable variations among the extant copies.

The Muslim historian Ibn Ishaq (c. 750), as cited in al-Tabari (c. 915), provides names for these wives which are generally similar to those in Jubilees, but he makes them Cainites rather than Sethites, despite clearly stating elsewhere that none of Noah's ancestors were descended from Cain.

Cain and Abel's sisters

Name: Aclima (or Calmana or Luluwa)
source: Golden Legend, which also tells stories about many of the saints
Appears in the Bible at: Genesis 4:17

Name: Delbora
source: Golden Legend, which also tells stories about many of the saints
Appears in the Bible at: Genesis 4

See also: Balbira and Kalmana, Azura and Awan for alternate traditions of names.

Noah's wife 

Name: Naamah
Source: Midrash Genesis Rabbah 23:4
Appears in the Bible at: Genesis 4:22; Gen. 7:7

Daughter of Lamech and Zillah and sister of Tubal-cain (Gen. iv. 22). According to Abba ben Kahana, Naamah was Noah's wife and was called "Naamah" (pleasant) because her conduct was pleasing to God. But the majority of the rabbis reject this statement, declaring that Naamah was an idolatrous woman who sang "pleasant" songs to idols.

See also Wives aboard the Ark for a list of traditional names given to the wives of Noah and his sons Shem, Ham, and Japheth.

Ham's wife

Name: Egyptus
Source: Book of Abraham  

The Mormon Book of Abraham, first published in 1842, mentions Egyptus (Abraham 1:23) as being the name of Ham's wife; his daughter apparently had the same name (v. 25).

Nimrod's wife 
A large body of legend has attached itself to Nimrod, whose brief mention in Genesis merely makes him "a mighty hunter in the face of the Lord". (The biblical account makes no mention of a wife at all.) These legends usually make Nimrod to be a sinister figure, and they reach their peak in Hislop's The Two Babylons, which make Nimrod and his wife Semiramis to be the original authors of every false and pagan religion.

Mother of Abraham

Name: Amthlai bath (daughter of) Khrubu
Source: Babylonian Talmud Tractate Baba Bathra Chapter 5
Appears in the Bible at: Book of Genesis

Lot's married daughter

Name: Paltith
Source: Book of Jasher 19:24
Appears in the Bible at: Book of Genesis

Lot's wife

Name: Ado (or  Edith, or Erith)
Source: Book of Jasher 19:52 (Ado); Pirkei De-Rabbi Eliezer (Edith)
Appears in the Bible at: Book of Genesis

Laban's wife

 Name: Adinah
 Source: Book of Jasher 28:28
 Appears in the Bible at: Book of Genesis

Potiphar's wife 

Name: Zuleikha
Source: The Sefer Hayyashar, a book of Jewish lore published in Venice in 1625.   Also, the Persian mystical poem "Yusuf and Zulaikha" by Jami.
Appears in the Bible at: Genesis 39:12

Potiphar's wife attempted to seduce Joseph in Egypt.

Pharaoh's daughter 

Name: Merris
Source: Eusebius of Caesarea (Preparation for the Gospel 9.15)

Name: Merrhoe
Source: Eustathius of Antioch (Commentary on Hexameron MPG 18.785)

Name: Thermutis
Source: Flavius Josephus

Name: Bithiah or Bitya
Source: Leviticus Rabbah
Appears in the Bible at: Exodus 2

Name: Sobekneferu or Neferusobek
Source: Unwrapping the Pharaohs

Pharaoh's daughter, who drew Moses out of the water, is known as Bithiah in Jewish tradition (identifying her with the "Pharaoh's daughter Bithiah" in 1 Chronicles 4:18).

Simeon's wife

Name: Bunah
Source: Book of Jasher 34:36 Legends of the Jews Volume 1 Chapter 6
Appears in the bible at: Genesis

Name: Dinah
Source: Midrash Bereshit Rabba 80:11. After Simeon and Levi slaughtered the men of Shechem, Dinah refused to go with them unless someone married her and raised the child of Prince Chamor she was carrying as his own. Simeon did this.

Pharaoh's magicians 

Names: Jannes and Jambres
Source: 2 Timothy 3:8, Book of Jasher chapter 79 Antiquities of the Jews Book 2 Aquarian Gospel of Jesus the Christ Chapter 109 Ante-Nicene Fathers, Vol. VIII Easton's Bible Dictionary The Book of the Bee Chapter 30 Nicene and Post-Nicene Fathers, Vol. XIII Legends of the Jews Volume 2 Chapter 4, Chronicles of Jerahmeel, Papyrus Chester Beatty XVI: Apocryphon of Jannes and Jambres
Appears in the Bible at: Exodus 7

The names of Jannes and Jambres, or Jannes and Mambres, were well known through the ancient world as magicians.  In this instance, nameless characters from the Hebrew Bible are given names in the New Testament. Their names also appear in numerous Jewish texts.

The Cushitic wife of Moses 

Name: Tharbis
Source: Flavius Josephus, Jewish Antiquities, Book II, Chapter 10
Appears in the Bible at: Numbers 12

Name: Adoniah
Source: Book of Jasher, 23.5–25.5

Job's wives 

Names: Sitis, Dinah
Source: The apocryphal Testament of Job
Appears in the Bible at: Book of Job

Apocryphal Jewish folklore says that Sitis, or Sitidos, was Job's first wife, who died during his trials.  After his temptation was over, the same sources say that Job remarried Dinah, Jacob's daughter who appears in Genesis.

Name: Raḥma
Source: Islamic tradition
The source does not tell which wife of Job has this name.

Jephthah's daughter 

Name: Seila
Source: Liber Antiquitatum Biblicarum
Name: Adah
Source: Order of the Eastern Star
Appears in the Bible at: Judges 11

The Liber Antiquitatum Biblicarum falsely ascribes itself to the Jewish author Philo.  It in fact did not surface until the sixteenth century; see Works of Philo.

Samson's mother

Name: Zelelponith
Source: Babylonian Talmud Tractate Baba Bathra Chapter 5
Appears in the Bible at: Book of Judges 13

David's mother

Name: Nzb'th, daughter of Edal
Source: Babylonian Talmud Tractate Baba Bathra Chapter 5 (folio 91a)
Appears in the Bible at: Book of Samuel

The Witch of Endor 

Name: Sedecla
Source: Liber Antiquitatum Biblicarum
Appears in the Bible at: 1 Samuel 28

The Man of God
Name: Iddo or Jadon
Source:
Named Jadon by Josephus in The Antiquities of the Jews VIII.8.5
Appears in the Bible at: 2 Chronicles 12:15 and 1 Kings 13

The wise woman of Abel 

Name: Serah
Source: Aggadic Midrash
Appears in the Bible at: 2 Samuel 20

The Queen of Sheba 

Name: Makeda
Source: Traditional Ethiopian lore surrounding Emperor Menelik I; see the Kebra Nagast

Name: Nicaule
Source: Josephus

Name: Bilqis
Source: Islamic traditions

Appears in the Bible at: 1 Kings 10; 2 Books of Chronicles 9

According to Ethiopian traditions, the Queen of Sheba returned to Ethiopia pregnant with King Solomon's child.  She bore Solomon a son that went on to found a dynasty that ruled Ethiopia until the fall of Emperor Haile Selassie in 1974.

Jeroboam's wife 

Name: Ano
Source: Septuagint
Appears in the Bible at: 1 Kings 14

Haman's mother

Name: Amthlai daughter of Urbthi
Source: Babylonian Talmud Tractate Baba Bathra Chapter 5
Appears in the Bible at: Book of Esther

Old Testament deuterocanonicals

The Deuterocanonical books, sometimes called the "Apocrypha", are considered canonical by Catholics, Eastern Orthodox, and Oriental Orthodox (though these churches' lists of books differ slightly from each other).

Seven Maccabees and their mother 
Name: Habroun, Hebsoun, Bakhous, Adai, Tarsai, Maqbai and Yawnothon.
Source: Maronite tradition

Name: Abim, Antonius, Gurias, Eleazar, Eusebonus, Alimus and Marcellus.
Source: Eastern Orthodox Tradition
The woman with seven sons is a Jewish martyr who is unnamed in 2 Maccabees 7, but is named Hannah, Miriam, Shamuna and Solomonia in other sources. According to Eastern Orthodox tradition, her sons, the "Holy Maccabean Martyrs" (not to be confused with the martyrs in the Ethiopian book of Meqabyan), are named Abim, Antonius, Gurias, Eleazar, Eusebonus, Alimus and Marcellus. According to the Syriac Maronite Fenqitho (book of festal offices), the name of the mother is Shmooni while her sons are Habroun, Hebsoun, Bakhous, Adai, Tarsai, Maqbai and Yawnothon.

The seven Archangels 
Name: Michael, Gabriel, Raphael, Uriel, Simiel, Oriphiel, and Raguel.
Source: Pope Gregory I

Name: Michael, Gabriel, Raphael, Uriel, Selaphiel, Jegudiel and Barachiel
Source: Byzantine Catholic and Eastern Orthodox Tradition

Name: Michael, Gabriel, Raphael, Uriel, Camael, Jophiel, and Zadkiel.
Source: Pseudo-Dionysius

Name: Michael, Gabriel, Raphael, Suriel, Zadkiel, Sarathiel, and Ananiel.
Source: Coptic Orthodox tradition

Name: Uriel, Raphael, Raguel, Michael, Sarakiel, Gabriel, and Remiel.
Source: Book of the Watchers

Tobit 12:15 reads "I am Raphael, one of the seven holy angels, which present the prayers of the saints, and which go in and out before the glory of the Holy One." Of the six unnamed archangels, Michael is named in the Book of Daniel, and Gabriel is named in the Gospel of Luke.

The Book of Enoch, deuterocanonical in the Ethiopian Orthodox Church, names the remaining four archangels Uriel, Raguel, Zerachiel, and Ramiel. Other sources name them Uriel, Izidkiel, Haniel, and Kepharel. In the Coptic Orthodox Church the names of these four archangels are given as Suriel, Sedakiel, Sarathiel and Ananiel.  Several other sets of names have also been given.

New Testament

The Magi 

 Names: Balthasar, Melqon, Gaspar
Source: Armenisches Kindheitsevangelium
 Names: Balthasar, Melchior, and Caspar (or Gaspar)
Source: European folklore
 Names: Basanater, Hor, and Karsudan
Source: The Book of Adam, an apocryphal Ethiopian text
 Names: Larvandad, Hormisdas, and Gushnasaph
Source: Syrian Christian folklore
 Names: Manatho, Alchor, and Gaspar
Source: White Shrine of Jerusalem - Masonic
Appear in the Bible at Matthew 2.
	
The Gospel does not state that there were, in fact, three magi or when exactly they visited Jesus, only that multiple magi brought three gifts: gold, frankincense, and myrrh.  Nevertheless, the number of magi is usually extrapolated from the number of gifts, and the three wise men are a staple of Christian nativity scenes.  While the European names have enjoyed the most publicity, other faith traditions have different versions. According to the Armenisches Kindheitsevangelium, the three magi were brothers and kings, namely Balthasar, king of India; Melqon, king of Persia; and Gaspar, king of Arabia. The Chinese Christian Church believes that the astronomer Liu Xiang was one of the wise men.

The Nativity shepherds 

 Names: Asher, Zebulun, Justus, Nicodemus, Joseph, Barshabba, and Jose
Source: The Syrian Book of the Bee written by Bishop Shelemon in the Aramaic language in the thirteenth century.
Appear in the Bible at Luke 2.

Jesus' sisters 
 Names: Maria
Source: Gospel of Philip
 Names: Assia and Lydia
Source: History of Joseph the Carpenter
 Names: Maria or Anna, Salomé
Source: Epiphanus

See .

The various versions of Epiphanus differ on whether one of the sisters was named Maria or Anna.

The Innocents 

 Names: Sicarius of Brantôme, St. Memorius
Source: St. Helena
Appears in the Bible at: Matthew 2:6–18.

Herodias' daughter 
 Name: Salome
Source: The Jewish Antiquities of Josephus, although that reference does not connect her with John the Baptist.
Appears in the Bible at Matthew 14, Mark 6.

Syrophoenician woman 

 Name: Justa
Source: 3rd century pseudo-Clementine homily
Appears in the Bible at Matthew 15, Mark 7.
According to the same source, her daughter was Berenice.

The child with Jesus 
 Name: Ignatius
Source: Early Christian Tradition
Appears in the Bible at Mark 9.

Several early Christian writers recorded a legend that the child whom Jesus took in his arms in Mark 9 was St. Ignatius of Antioch.

Hæmorrhaging woman 
 Name: Berenice
Source: Apocryphal Gospel of Nicodemus
 Name: Veronica
Source: Latin translation of the apocryphal Gospel of Nicodemus (Gos. Nicodemus 5:26)

Veronica is a Latin variant of Berenice. Veronica or Berenice obtained some of Jesus' blood on a cloth at the Crucifixion (see also: Veil of Veronica). Tradition identifies her with the woman who was healed of a bleeding discharge in the Gospel.

 Samaritan woman at the well 
 Name: Photini
Source: Eastern Orthodox Church Tradition
Appears in the Bible at John 4:5–42.

In the tradition of the Eastern Orthodox Church, the name of the woman at the well when she met Jesus is unknown, but she became a follower of Christ, received the name Photini in baptism, proclaimed the Gospel over a wide area, and was later martyred. She is recognized as a saint in the Eastern Orthodox Church.

 Damned rich man 
 Name: Nineveh
Source: Coptic folklore
 Name: Phineas
Source: Pseudo-Cyprian, De pascha computus Name: Dives
Source: European Christian folklore
Appears in the Bible at .Dives is simply Latin for "rich", and as such may not count as a proper name. The story of the blessed Lazarus and the damned rich man is widely recognised under the title of Dives and Lazarus, which may have resulted in this word being taken for a proper name.

 Woman taken in adultery 
 Name: Mary Magdalene
Source: Western Christian tradition
Appears in the Bible at John 8.

A long-standing Western Christian tradition first attested by Pope Gregory I identifies the woman taken in adultery with Mary Magdalene, and also with Mary of Bethany. Jesus had exorcised seven demons out of Mary Magdalene (Mark ), and Mary Magdalene appears prominently in the several accounts of Jesus' entombment and resurrection, but there is no indication in the Bible that clearly states that Mary Magdalene was the same person as the adulteress forgiven by Jesus.

The Eastern Orthodox Church has never identified Mary Magdalene as either the woman taken in adultery, or the sinful woman who anointed Jesus' feet.

 The man born blind 
 Name: Celidonius
Source: Christian tradition
Appears in the Bible at John .

 Pontius Pilate's wife 

 Name: Claudia, Procla, Procula, Perpetua or Claudia Procles
Source: European folklore; Dolorous Passion of our Lord Jesus Christ (as "Claudia Procles")

During the trial of Jesus the wife of Pontius Pilate sent a message to him saying, "Have nothing to do with that just man; for I have suffered many things this day in a dream because of him."

The proposed names of Procla and Procula may not be names at all, but simply a form of Pilate's official title of Procurator, indicating that she was the Procurator's wife.

 Thieves crucified with Jesus 
 Names: Titus and Dumachus
Source: Arabic Gospel of the Infancy of the Saviour Names: Dismas and Gestas (or Gesmas)
Source: Acts of Pilate Names: Demas (the good thief)
Source: Narrative of Joseph of Arimathea Name: Zoatham/Zoathan (the good thief)
Source: Codex Colbertinus Name: Rakh (the good thief)
Source: Russian Orthodox tradition
Appear in the Bible at: Matthew 27, Mark 15, Luke 23, John 19.

The good thief is revered under the name Saint Dismas in the Catholic Church and the Coptic Orthodox Church.

 Soldier who pierced Jesus with a spear 

 Name: Longinus
Source: Apocryphal Gospel of Nicodemus (Gos. Nicodemus 7:8)

In tradition, he is called Cassius before his conversion to Christianity. The Lance of Longinus, also known as the Spear of Destiny, is supposedly preserved as a relic, and various miracles are said to be worked through it.

 Man who offered Jesus vinegar 
 Name: Agathon
Source: Codex Egberti, 10th century

 Guard(s) at Jesus' tomb 
 Name of centurion: Petronius
Source: Apocryphal Gospel of Peter (Gos. Peter 8)
 Names of soldiers: Issachar, Gad, Matthias, Barnabas, Simon

 Ethiopian Eunuch baptized by the Apostle Philip 

 Name: Simeon Bachos
Source: Adversus haereses (Against the Heresies, an early anti-Gnostic theological work) 3:12:8 (180 AD)
 Name: Bachos
Source: Ethiopian Orthodox Tewahedo tradition
Appears in the Bible at Acts of the Apostles 8:27.

In Eastern Orthodox tradition he is known as an Ethiopian Jew with the name Simeon also called the Black, the same name he is given in the Acts of the Apostles 13:1.

Daughters of Philip
 Name: Hermione; Eutychis; Irais and Chariline
Source: Traditional.  See Daughters of Philip
Appears in the Bible at Acts of the Apostles 21.8-9.

See also
Seventy Disciples

References

Further reading
"Names for the Nameless", in The Oxford Companion to the Bible'', Bruce M. Metzger and Michael D. Coogan, editors.  
Ilan, Tal. “Biblical Women’s Names in the Apocryphal Traditions.” Journal for the Study of the Pseudepigrapha 6, no. 11 (1993): 3–67.
"The Poem of the Man God", Centro Editoriale Valtortiano srl, Maria Valtorta. (5 Volumes) no ISBN.

 
nameless
Christian folklore
 
Jewish folklore
Biblical nameless